Šopot is a village in Croatia. It is connected by the D27 state road. The name of the place comes from OCS word *sopotъ and means resurgence. Branimir Inscription was found in the place among the ruins of medieval church, also founded by duke Branimir.

References

Populated places in Zadar County
Benkovac